Sturisoma nigrirostrum is a species of armored catfish endemic to Peru where it occurs in the Ucayali River basin. This species inhabits gently to swiftly flowing white waters where submerged wood is abundant in the main flow of rivers. Sexual dimorphism includes hypertrophied odontodes on the sides of the head of the male.

References
 

Sturisoma
Fish of South America
Freshwater fish of Peru
Fish described in 1940